Ellen Scheel Aalbu (born 26 November 1968) is a former Norwegian football player who played for the Norway women's national football team.

She played for the club IL Jardar. She was capped 32 times, participated on the winning team at the 1987 European Competition for Women's Football, and played on the Norwegian team that won silver medals at the 1991 FIFA Women's World Cup in China.

She is married to Jan Erik Aalbu.

References

1968 births
Living people
Sportspeople from Bærum
Norwegian women's footballers
1991 FIFA Women's World Cup players
Norway women's international footballers
UEFA Women's Championship-winning players

Women's association footballers not categorized by position